The black-bellied hornet (Vespa basalis) is a species of hornet native to Taiwan.  It is one of the most dangerous species of hornet on the island, and its venom induces edema.  Colonies may have as many as 5,000 individual hornets.

Distribution

Introduced
None known. One specimen was photographed in Richmond, British Columbia, Canada, in July 2019 and was identified by several experts as V. basalis. However there have been no other sightings and this is believed to not represent a local population.

References

Vespidae
Insects of Taiwan
Insects described in 1852